Phil O'Donnell may refer to:

Phil O'Donnell (cyclist), American cyclist, see United States at the 2013 UCI Road World Championships
Phil O'Donnell (Irish republican) (1932–1982), volunteer in the Derry Brigade of the Provisional Irish Republican Army and member of Saor Uladh
Phil O'Donnell (footballer) (1972–2007), Motherwell, Celtic and Scotland football player
Philip C. O'Donnell (1915–1986), American politician